Fiona McAlpine is a British radio drama producer and director. Her company,  Allegra Productions, is an independent production company based in Suffolk, England.

Works

Current Production on BBC Radio 4.
Broadcast 11, 18 April April – 25 April 2021 The Magic Mountain by Thomas Mann
Dramatised by Robin Brooks
Based on the Translation by John E. Woods CAST
Luke Thallon, Lucy Robinson, Hugh Skinner, Genevieve Gaunt, Sandy Grierson, Stephen Hogan, Keziah Joseph, Georgina Strawson, Ed Jones, Huw Brentnall, Kate Paul, Georgia Brown,Lilit Lesser.

Dramas produced and directed by Fiona McAlpine 2015 to 2021 

Kingmaker: Winter Pilgrims by Gregory Evans for Towton Audio  5 hour episodes.
https://kingmakeraudio.com/
https://kingmakeraudio.com/cast-crew/
Launched by Towton Audio on 29 March 2021

The Brummie Iliad for BBC Radio 3 by Roderick Smith (based on Homer's Iliad)
https://www.bbc.co.uk/programmes/m000rtxd
Broadcast 31 January 2021

USA by John Dos Passos for BBC Radio 4 - (3 episodes)
https://www.bbc.co.uk/programmes/m000nkhb
Broadcast October to November 2020

The Talking Mongoose for BBC Radio 4
https://www.bbc.co.uk/programmes/m000hvb9
Broadcast 3 June 2020

Elizabeth and Essex by Robin Brooks for BBC Radio 3 with Simon Russell Beale and the BBC Concert Orchestra
Live performance at the Alexandra Palace on 3 Feb 2020
Broadcast on Radio 3 "Drama on 3" 12 April 2020.
https://www.bbc.co.uk/programmes/m000h6t9

The Garrick Year by Margaret Drabble adapted by Robin Brooks with Melody Grove, Tom Burke, Trystan Gravelle
https://www.bbc.co.uk/programmes/m000h295
Broadcast 5 April 2020

A Kestrel for a Knave by Barry Hines, adapted by Robert Rigby for Goldhawk Essential and BBC Radio 4
https://www.bbc.co.uk/programmes/m00088gf
Broadcast September 2019

Get Carter: The Bloody Chamber by Angela Carter, adapted by Olivia Hetreed for BBC Radio 4
Broadcast Sept 2018
https://www.bbc.co.uk/programmes/b0bkqt8g

Get Carter: The Christchurch Murder (screenplay by Angela Carter) adapted by Robin Brooks for BBC Radio 4
Broadcast Sept 2018
https://www.bbc.co.uk/programmes/b0bknc4b

Vampirella by Angela Carter for BBC Radio 3 
Come unto these Yellow Sands (producer only) for BBC Radio 3
Both plays as part of 'An Evening with Angela Carter', starring Fiona Shaw as Angela Carter
Broadcast Sept 2018
https://www.bbc.co.uk/programmes/m0000h9p

Byzantium by Robin Brooks for BBC Radio 3
Broadcast March 2018
https://www.bbc.co.uk/programmes/b09tclyz

Remorse, or the sorrows of Samuel Taylor Coleridge, by Robin Brooks (directed by Jeremy Mortimer)
Broadcast March 2016
https://www.bbc.co.uk/programmes/b07f6mhd

The Dark Tower by Louis MacNeice and music by Benjamin Britten (producer only) with the BBC Concert Orchestra
Performed live in front of an audience at Orford Church, Suffolk
Broadcast on BBC Radio 3 Oct 2017
https://www.bbc.co.uk/programmes/b09bx5l4

Iris Murdoch: Dream Girl by Robin Brooks, with Helen McCrory, Anton Lesser, Jasper Britton for BBC Radio 4
https://www.bbc.co.uk/programmes/b066fxt1
Broadcast August 2015

The Sea, The Sea, by Iris Murdoch, dramatised by Robin Brooks, directed by Bill Alexander, Produced by Fiona McAlpine
with Jeremy Irons, Simon Williams, Joanna David, Sara Kestelman.
Broadcast August 2015
https://www.bbc.co.uk/programmes/b066ttr9

The Boy from Aleppo who painted the War by Richard Kurti and Bev Doyle for B7 Productions and BBC Radio 4
Broadcast Sept 2014
https://www.bbc.co.uk/programmes/b04nqpd0

Then see table below: from 2003 to 2013

Missed out from table below (2001 and 2003)

2001 - Love and Friendship by Jane Austen,  Adapted by Robin Brooks
Produced & Directed  by Fiona McAlpine, Exec. Producer: Clive Brill (Pacificus Productions) for BBC Radio 4 Afternoon drama
Cast:  David Tennant, Victoria Hamilton, David Horovitch, Janet Jeffries.

2003 - 7 August
A Quick Change
by Robin Brooks
Produced and Directed by Fiona McAlpine, Exec. Producer : Clive Brill (Pacificus productions), for BBC Radio 4
Cast: 
David Tennant, Ashley Jenson, Flora Montgomery, Alan Cox, Raza Jaffrey, Mark Spalding, Barbara Dryhurst, Jonathan Tafler
https://genome.ch.bbc.co.uk/b5724855e3d948538c7148f66177d56d

Theatre:
Directed and Produced Britten's Got Talent a new play about Benjamin Britten by Robin Brooks
at the New Wolsey Studio, 2013.
https://www.wolseytheatre.co.uk/shows/brittens-got-talent/
with Keith Hill, Jonathan Hansler, Sam Dale, Gilian Cally, Joseph Reed, Theo Christie, Sam Bell
Music by Matthew Sheeran, Songs by Damian Evans, Choreography by Louisa McAlpine

Abridgement:
She also abridges books and stories for radio.

Fiona McAlpine directed Duce's Bonce about her great-aunt the Irish aristocrat Hon. Violet Gibson who tried to assassinate Benito Mussolini in 1926, and Jon Canter's I Love Stephen Fry in which Stephen Fry played a cameo role.

Fiona McAlpine has abridged for radio:
In Cold  Blood by Truman Capote
Seeds of Greatness by Jon Canter
The Rapture by Liz Jensen
Enoch's Two Letters by Alan Sillitoe
No Name in the Street by Alan Sillitoe
The Caller by Alan Sillitoe
The Story of a Marriage by Andrew Sean Greer

Radio plays

Notes:

References

BBC Radio drama directors
BBC radio producers
Living people
Year of birth missing (living people)
Women radio producers